Devine High School is a public high school located in the city of Devine, Texas, USA and classified as a 4A school by the UIL.  It is a part of the Devine Independent School District located in southeastern Medina County.   In 2015, the school was rated "Met Standard" by the Texas Education Agency.

Athletics
The Devine Warhorses compete in these sports - 

Volleyball, Cross Country, Football, Basketball, Powerlifting, Golf, Tennis, Track, Baseball & Softball

State Titles
Girls Basketball - 
1962(2A)
Volleyball - 
1987(3A), 1988(3A)

State Finalist
Softball - 
1994(3A), 2000(3A)

References

External links
 
 Devine ISD

Schools in Medina County, Texas
Public high schools in Texas
1881 establishments in Texas